Sainte-Brigitte-de-Laval is a city in La Jacques-Cartier Regional County Municipality in the Capitale-Nationale region of Quebec, Canada. Its urban area is located in the hollow of the Montmorency River valley, northeast of Quebec City.

The city is named in honor of Brigid of Kildare as a recall the irish origin of the first settlers. The name Laval comes from the situation of Sainte-Brigitte in the seigneury of Beaupré, whose first owner was François de Laval, bishop of Quebec.

Demographics 

Mother tongue:
 French as first language: 97.1%
 English as first language: 0.8%
 English and French as first language: 0.8%
 Other as first language: 1.0%

Government

Sainte-Brigitte-de-Laval forms part of the federal electoral district of Portneuf—Jacques-Cartier and has been represented by Joël Godin of the Conservative Party since 2015. Provincially, Sainte-Brigitte-de-Laval is part of the Montmorency electoral district and is represented by Jean-François Simard of the Coalition Avenir Québec since 2018.

Administration
2022 administration:
 Mayor: France Fortier
 District #1: Simon St-Hilaire
 District #2: Guillaume Plamondon
 District #3: Dominic Morin
 District #4: Mathieu Thomassin
 District #5: Charles Morissette
 District #6: Michèle Dufresne

See also
List of municipalities in Quebec

References

External links

Incorporated places in Capitale-Nationale
Cities and towns in Quebec